The Pârâu is a left tributary of the river Valea Nouă in Romania. It flows into the Valea Nouă near Oșand.

References

Rivers of Romania
Rivers of Bihor County